William Scot Wilson (1806 – 17 March 1888) was a Scottish bishop of the Scottish Episcopal Church, who served as Bishop of Glasgow and Galloway between 1859 and 1888.

Life and ministry 
Wilson was born in Pittenweem, Fife in 1806, the son of the Reverend David Wilson. He was educated at King's College, Aberdeen, from where he graduated with a Master of Arts] in 1827. He also gained his theological training from Edinburgh Theological College.  He was awarded a Doctor of Laws from Trinity College Dublin in 1859, and a Doctor of Divinity from Hobart College. 

He was ordained deacon in 1827 and priest in 1829 by Bishop David Low of Ross and Argyle. He then ministered in Inverness-shire. In 1832 he was appointed rector of Holy Trinity Church in Ayr, a post he retained during his episcopacy, till his death  He also became Dean of Glasgow and Galloway in 1845. In 1859, he was elected Bishop of Glasgow and Galloway, and remained so till his death in Ayr in 1888.) He was consecrated in St Paul's Church in Edinburgh, by the Primus Charles Terrot, on April 26, 1859.

References

Bishops of Glasgow and Galloway
19th-century Scottish Episcopalian bishops
1806 births
1888 deaths

People from Pittenweem